The 1893 New Zealand general election was held on 28 November and 20 December in the European and Māori electorates, respectively, to elect 74 MPs to the 12th session of the New Zealand Parliament. The election was won by the Liberal Party, and Richard Seddon became Prime Minister.

1893 was the year universal suffrage was granted to women over 21 (including Māori), plural registration was abolished, plural voting for Māori property-owners was abolished, and only those whose descent was exactly half Māori were allowed to choose whether to vote in European or Māori electorates. Women's suffrage was the most consequential change.

1892 electoral redistribution
The 1891 New Zealand census was the first to automatically trigger an electoral redistribution, which was undertaken in 1892. The population drift to the North Island resulted in the transfer of one electorate from the south to the north.

Women's suffrage

By far the most notable change for the 1893 election was that the Electoral Act, 1893, extended the franchise to all women (including Māori) aged 21 and over. Women's suffrage was granted after about two decades of campaigning by women such as Kate Sheppard and Mary Ann Müller and organisations such as the New Zealand branch of the Women's Christian Temperance Union led by Anne Ward. Of countries presently independent, New Zealand was the first to give women the vote in modern times. John Hall, a Conservative politician and former premier, received most of the credit for pushing the legislation through Parliament; he is the only male who has his name inscribed on the Kate Sheppard National Memorial. There were only 10 weeks between the passage of the legislation and the election, and the Woman's Christian Temperance Union (WCTU) set about to enrol as many women as possible.

The bill had passed under the Liberal government which generally advocated social and political reform, but only due to a combination of personality issues and political accident. Seddon opposed it (unlike many other Liberals) because many women supported prohibition. He had expected to stop the bill in the upper house, but found that one more vote was needed. Thomas Kelly, a new Liberal Party councillor had left himself paired in favour of the measure, but Seddon obtained his consent by wire to change his vote. Seddon's manipulation so incensed two opposition councillors, William Reynolds and Edward Stevens that they changed sides and voted for the bill, which was passed by 20 votes to 18 so giving the vote to women. Both the Liberals and the Conservatives subsequently claimed credit for sponsoring the enfranchisement of women and both sought to acquire women's votes, although the Liberals benefitted more.

The election
The 1893 election was held on Tuesday, 28 November in the general electorates, and on Wednesday, 20 December in the Māori electorates to elect a total of 74 MPs to the 12th Parliament.

A total number of 302,997 (75.3%) voters turned out to vote. 65% of all eligible New Zealand women voted in the 1893 election. In 3 seats there was only one candidate. 31 and 39 electorates were in the North Island and South Island, respectively, plus the 4 Māori electorates.

Results

Party totals

Votes summary

Electorate results
The following is a table of electorate results by electorate.
Key

|-
 |colspan=8 style="background-color:#FFDEAD" | General electorates
|-

|-
 | rowspan=3 | Auckland, City of
 | style="background-color:;" |
 | style="text-align:center;" | John Shera
 | style="background-color:;" |
 | style="text-align:center;background-color:;" | George Grey
 | style="text-align:right;" | 2,233
 | rowspan=3 style="background-color:;" |
 | rowspan=3 style="text-align:center;" | Thomas Tudehope
|-
 | style="background-color:;" |
 | style="text-align:center;" | Thomas Thompson
 | style="background-color:;" |
 | style="text-align:center;background-color:;" | William Crowther
 | style="text-align:right;" | 438
|-
 | style="background-color:;" |
 | style="text-align:center;" | Alfred Cadman
 | style="background-color:;" |
 | style="text-align:center;background-color:;" | Charles Button
 | style="text-align:right;" | 68
|-

|-
 | rowspan=3 | Christchurch, City of
 | style="background-color:;" |
 | colspan=3 style="text-align:center;background-color:;" | William Pember Reeves
 | style="text-align:right;" | 1,848
 | rowspan=3 style="background-color:;" |
 | rowspan=3 style="text-align:center;" |  Ebenezer Sandford
|-
 | style="background-color:;" |
 | style="text-align:center;" | Ebenezer Sandford
 | style="background-color:;" |
 | style="text-align:center;background-color:;" | George Smith
 | style="text-align:right;" | 916
|-
 | style="background-color:;" |
 | style="text-align:center;" | Richard Molesworth Taylor
 | style="background-color:;" |
 | style="text-align:center;background-color:;" | William Whitehouse Collins
 | style="text-align:right;" | 281
|-

|-
 | rowspan=3 | Dunedin, City of
 | style="background-color:;" |
 |colspan=3 style="text-align:center;background-color:;" | David Pinkerton
 | style="text-align:right;" | 1,294
 | rowspan=3 style="background-color:;" | 
 | rowspan=3 style="text-align:center;" | Henry Fish
|-
 | style="background-color:;" |
 | style="text-align:center;" | Henry Fish
 | style="background-color:;" |
 | style="text-align:center;background-color:;" | William Earnshaw
 | style="text-align:right;" | 589
|-
 | style="background-color:;" |
 | colspan=3 style="text-align:center;background-color:;" | William Hutchison
 | style="text-align:right;" | 294
|-

|-
 | rowspan=3 | Wellington, City of
 | style="background-color:;" |
 | colspan=3 style="text-align:center;background-color:;" | John Duthie
 | style="text-align:right;" | 
 | rowspan=3 style="background-color:;" |
 | rowspan=3 style="text-align:center;" | Kennedy Macdonald
|-
 | style="background-color:;" |
 | style="text-align:center;" | George Fisher
 | style="background-color:;" |
 | style="text-align:center;background-color:;" | Francis Bell
 | style="text-align:right;" |
|-
 | style="background-color:;" |
 | style="text-align:center;" | William McLean
 | style="background-color:;" |
 | style="text-align:center;background-color:;" | Sir Robert Stout
 | style="text-align:right;" |
|-

|-
 |colspan=8 style="background-color:#FFDEAD" | Māori electorates
|-

|}

Table footnotes:

Notes

References

External links
Roll of Members of the House of Representatives, August 1896 (i.e. prior to the next general election)